Tokata Iron Eyes (born 2003/2004) is a Native American activist and member of the Standing Rock Sioux tribe. Iron Eyes was a youth leader of "ReZpect our Water", a campaign against the proposed route of the Dakota Access Pipeline and also served on the board of a sustainable energy group called Indigenized Energy.

Activism 
Iron Eyes began her activism at age nine, when she testified against a uranium mine in the Black Hills. At age 12, she spoke in a viral video advocating for action against the Dakota Access Pipeline, which later sparked the social media campaign, "Rezpect Our Water." In September 2019, Iron Eyes met youth climate activist Greta Thunberg at George Washington University. Iron Eyes invited Thunberg to Iron Eyes' homelands, and the two held multiple rallies together in North Dakota and South Dakota in October 2019, including at the Red Cloud Indian School on the Pine Ridge Reservation in South  Dakota, where Iron Eyes was a student; at the Youth Climate Activism Panel in Rapid City, South Dakota; and at Standing Rock High School in Fort Yates, North Dakota.

Iron Eyes also served on the board of a new sustainable energy group called Indigenized Energy.

Personal life 
Tokata Iron Eyes is the child of Chase Iron Eyes, an activist, attorney, and politician, and Sara Jumping Eagle, a pediatrician and environmental activist. Tokata Iron Eyes is also a singer and songwriter, and attended Bard College at Simon's Rock.

According to a statement made by her father in June, 2022, Iron Eyes is nonbinary. Iron Eyes has continued to use the name Tokatawin on the Instagram account, but for a time in the summer of 2022 she was also, at times, using the name "Gibson"; for a while in June the pronoun on the Instagram account was "she"; on June 22, 2022, the pronouns were changed to "she/they". As of November, 2022, the additional name on the Instagram account has been changed back to "Tokata".

Relationship with Ezra Miller

In June 2022, Iron Eyes' parents filed legal documents asking a judge to issue an order of protection against actor Ezra Miller on her behalf, due to Miller allegedly using "violence, intimidation, threat of violence, fear, paranoia, delusions, and drugs" including marijuana and LSD to hold sway over her. Although Iron Eyes is 18, due to tribal regulations Iron Eyes' parents are still considered her legal guardians.

Iron Eyes' parents claim that an inappropriate relationship began between the pair in 2016, during the Dakota Access Pipeline protests, when Miller was 23 and Iron Eyes was 12. They further claim, and photos document, that the year after the two met, Iron Eyes flew to London to visit Miller on the set of Fantastic Beasts and Where to Find Them; in 2021 she dropped out of school, allegedly to follow Miller. Iron Eyes' parents also alleged in the legal documents that Miller caused bruises on Tokata and that Miller had given Iron Eyes a large amount of LSD in 2020. A response came via Tokata's Instagram account, denying the parents' allegations, declaring herself to be both mentally stable and in contact with a mental health professional.

Her parents' countered by claiming their child does not control her social media. Iron Eyes stated in the video response that it's her own choice not to have a phone. , law enforcement has been unable to locate Miller to serve them with the order. Miller then posted messages on their Instagram account mocking the court's attempts to find them, but has since deleted them. 

In August, Miller's former music collaborator Oliver Ignatius stated that he had witnessed Miller verbally abuse Iron Eyes over her wearing makeup. She defended Miller by referring to the incident as "a catty comment" and a part of "queer dialogue"; she called the allegation of abuse "homophobic".

According to a September 2022 Vanity Fair article, the tribal court dismissed the request for a permanent protective order, and the parents say they withdrew their request for custody, believing the odds were stacked against them; the same article reports that Miller claimed to be Jesus, the devil, and the next Messiah while Iron Eyes believed herself to be a Native American spider goddess. The article also claimed that Miller and Iron Eyes believe their relationship will bring about a Native American revolution followed by the apocalypse.

Awards and recognition 
In January 2020, Iron Eyes was featured on Disney+ in an episode of Marvel's Hero Project as "Thrilling Tokata". In May 2020, she was named one of the Ms. Foundation's 2020 Women of Vision, and she received the Peggy C. Charren Free to Be You and Me Award.

See also
List of solved missing person cases

Notes

References

External links 
 The Indigenous Youth Fighting Against Environmental Destruction – "'Respect our water, respect our land, respect our people.' On the Pine Ridge Reservation in South Dakota, 17-year-old Indigenous climate activist Tokata Iron Eyes struggles to balance her personal goals and schoolwork while continuing the fight for Indigenous rights and land back." Video by VICE

2004 births
2020s missing person cases
21st-century apocalypticists
21st-century Native Americans
Activists from North Dakota
American child activists
Bard College alumni
Deified people
Formerly missing people
LGBT Native Americans
LGBT people from North Dakota
Living people
Missing person cases in the United States
Native American environmentalists
Non-binary activists
Standing Rock Sioux people